This is a list of songs about Jerusalem, including major parts of the city such as individual neighborhoods and sections. Religiously significant to all three Abrahamic religions for centuries and politically controversial since the inception of the Zionist movement, Jerusalem has been artistically associated with widely varied concepts. There are many songs about Jerusalem from various time periods, especially nationalistically-themed songs from the time of the Six-Day War, when East Jerusalem passed from Jordanian control to Israeli.

Additionally many Biblical Psalms, styled as songs, were written specifically about Jerusalem. Jewish liturgy and hymns are rife with references to Jerusalem.

Hebrew language
"Jerusalem" by Kenneth Lampl (2012) performed by the Zamir Chorale of Boston
"Al Chomotaich" ("On Your Walls, Jerusalem") by Yaakov Shwekey
"Anachnu olim elaich, Yerushalayim" ("We coming for you, Jerusalem"), performed by Nira Rabinovich
"Bisharayich Yerushalayim" ("At Jerusalem Gates"), saluting the Israel Defense Forces paratroopers of the Six-Day War
"Biyerushalayim" ("In Jerusalem") by Miami Boys Choir, (1997)
"Giv'at HaTahmoshet" ("Ammunition Hill") by Yoram Taharlev
"Himnon Hapoel Yerushalayim" ("Hapoel Jerusalem F.C. anthem") by Dudu Barak
"Hineh ani ba" ("Here I Come", on the conflict of everyday life in Jerusalem vs. Tel Aviv) by Hadag Nahash
"Hineni kan" ("Jerusalem, here I am") by Yehoram Gaon and Harel Skaat
"Im eshkachech Yerushalayim" ('If I Forget Thee Jerusalem') by Miami Boys Choir, (2001)
"Kinor David" ("The violin of King David"), by Avihu Medina
"Lemaan tzion lo eshkakhekh" ("For Zion I will not forget you") by Miami Boys Choir
"Lach Yerushalayim" ("For you, Jerusalem") by Amos Etinger, performed by Ronit Ofir
"Lekol' echad Yerushalayim" ("Jerusalem is for each one") by Nathan Yehonathan, performed by Dorit Reuveni
"Leshana haba'a biyerushalayim" ("Next Year in Jerusalem"), by Miami Boys Choir
"Me'al pisgat Har Hatzofim" ( "From Atop Mount Scopus") by Avigdor Hameiri, performed by Yehoram Gaon
"Shomer hahomot" ( "Walls guardman"), performed by Military orchestra of Central Command of IDF 
"Sisu et Yerushalayim" ( "Rejoice in Jerusalem"), performed by Dudu Fisher
"Veliyerushalayim" ("And to Jerusalem") by Miami Boys Choir
"Yerushalayim" by Avraham Fried, (1995)
"Yerushalayim" performed by Esther Ofarim (1978)
"Yerushalayim" by Shimrit Or, performed by Ilana Avital
"Yerushalayim" by Mordechai Ben David
"Yerushalayim" by Miami Boys Choir (2007)
"Yerushalayim Ha'akheret" ("The Different Jerusalem"), performed by Izhar Cohen and in 2017 at the ceremony for the 50th anniversary of reunification of Jerusalem by Sarit Hadad 
"Yerushalayim Can You Hear Our Voice" by Miami Boys Choir, (2001)
"Yerushalayim shel barzel" ("Jerusalem of Iron") by Meir Ariel
"Yerushalayim shel Beitar" ("Jerusalem of Beitar"), performed by Itzik Kala and others
"Yerushalayim sheli" ("My Jerusalem") by Dan Almagor and Nurit Hirsh
"Zot Yerushalayim" ("This is Jerusalem") by Nahum Heyman
"O Jerusalem" ("O Jerusalem") by Ben Snof
"Tsion Halo Tish'ali"(Hebrew: ציון הלא תשאלי) by Yehoda HaLevi

National and folk songs
"Hatikvah", national anthem of Israel, mentions Jerusalem heavily
"Yerushalayim shel zahav" ("Jerusalem of Gold") by Naomi Shemer, performed by Shuli Natan, Ofra Haza and many others around the globe 
"Lakh Yerushalayim" ("For You, Jerusalem")
"Shabekhi Yerushalayim" ("Praise the Lord, Jerusalem!"), based on Psalms 147:12–13 (lyrics) and Avihu Medina, performed by Glykeria and many others
"Yefe Noff" ("Beautiful scenery"), written by Judah Halevi 12th cet., based on Psalms 48:3, performed by Etti Ankri

Jewish liturgy
The third paragraph of the Birkat HaMazon, the Grace After Meals is completely about God blessing Jerusalem and rebuilding it.
Lekhah dodi (Hebrew: לכה דודי, "Come, my beloved"), written by Rabbi Shlomo Halevi is recited at Kabbalat Shabbat and makes many references to Jerusalem as the royal city and that it shall be rebuilt over its ruins.

Shabbat zemirot
"Tzur Mishelo Achalnu" ("Rock from whom we have eaten") – the last two stanzas are about having compassion for the city of Zion and for a restoration there.
"Ya Ribon Olam" ("God Master of the World") – is a song in Hebrew and Aramaic whose final stanza is about the restoration of the Temple in "Jerusalem, City of Beauty"
"Yom zeh l'Yisrael" ("This is a day for Israel") – the final stanza asks God to remember the ruined city, Jerusalem.

Arabic language
"Al Quds Al Atiqa" ("Jerusalem's Ancient Streets") by Fairuz
"Zahrat al Meda'in" ("Flower of Cities") by Fairuz (1968)
"Al Quds" ("Jerusalem") by Latifa and Kazem al-Saher
"Al Quds De Ardina" ("Jerusalem is Our Land") by Amr Diab
"Al Quds Lena" ("Jerusalem is Ours") by Hakim
"Al Quds Haterga' Lena" ("Jerusalem Will Return to Us") by Hisham Abbas, Hakim, Anoushka, et al.
"Ya Quds" ("Oh Jerusalem") by Nawal Elzoghbi
"Ala Bab al Quds" ("At the Doors of Jerusalem") by Hani Shaker
"Abda´ meneen?" ("Where should I begin?") by Zena
"Hamaam al-Quds" ("Doves of Jerusalem") by Julia Boutros, Amal Arafa and Sausan Hamami
"Il-Gudes Naadat" ("Jerusalem called") by Al Waad

English language
 "The Holy City" by Frederic Weatherly and Stephen Adams, released in 1892
 "Jerusalem" by Sleep, first released in 1999

Italian language
"Gerusalemme" by Amedeo Minghi, (1999)

Russian language
"Dnyom i Nochyu" also known as "Ierusalim" (Russian: Иерусалим, "Jerusalem") by Alexander Rosenbaum

References

Songs about Jerusalem
Jerusalem
Culture of Jerusalem